The QF 4-inch gun Mk IV was the main gun on most Royal Navy and British Empire destroyers in World War I. It was introduced in 1911 as a faster-loading light gun successor to the BL 4 inch Mk VIII gun. Of the 1,141 produced, 939 were still available in 1939. Mk XII and Mk XXII variants armed many British interwar and World War II submarines.

Mk IV gun

Mk IV armed many British destroyers and some cruisers in World War I.
It was used to arm merchant ships in World War II.

The guns armed the following warships :
 Forward-class scout cruisers as re-gunned in 1911
 Sentinel-class scout cruisers as re-gunned 1911-1912
 Pathfinder-class scout cruisers as re-gunned 1911-1912
 Adventure-class scout cruisers as re-gunned 1911-1912
 Acasta (K)-class destroyers of 1911
 Laforey (L)-class destroyers of 1913
 Yarrow M-class destroyers laid down 1912 - 1915
 Admiralty M-class destroyer of 1913
 Thornycroft M-class destroyers laid down 1913 - 1915
 Hawthorn M-class destroyer of 1914
 s of 1914
 s of 1914
 Faulknor-class leaders of 1914
 s of 1914
 Parker class leaders of 1915
 Yarrow Later M-class destroyers of 1915
 R-class destroyers of 1916
 S-class destroyers of 1917
 s of 1938 (guns from decommissioned Canadian S-class destroyers)

Mk XII and XXII submarine gun

The Mk XII variant was developed for arming submarines from 1918, Mk XXII was developed to arm submarines during World War II. These submarine guns fired a heavier  projectile from late 1944. Shortly after the end of hostilities, the Mk XXII was superseded in new British submarines by the lighter QF 4 inch Mk XXIII.

Mk XII and XXII equipped submarines
 L class
 Odin ("O") class
 Parthian ("P") class
 River (or Thames) class
 Grampus (or Porpoise) class
 Triton ("T") class
 S class
 Some of the Amphion ("A" or Acheron) class

Surviving guns
 A Mk IV gun on a 1945 Mk XVI mounting is on display at the Heugh Gun Battery Museum in Hartlepool, County Durham.
 A Mk IV gun on a pedestal mounting is still in situ at Ordnance Point in the Falkland Islands, where it is believed to have been installed in 1943.
 A First World War 4-inch naval gun, tentatively identified as a Mk IV, stands outside the Army, Navy and Air Force Veterans Hall in 4th Street, Sidney, British Columbia.

See also
 List of naval guns

Weapons of comparable role, performance and era
 10.5 cm SK L/45 naval gun : German WWI equivalent
 10.5 cm SK C/32 naval gun : Slightly more powerful German equivalent WWII submarine gun
 4"/50 caliber gun : US Navy equivalent

Notes

References

Sources
 Tony DiGiulian, British 4"/40 (10.2 cm) QF Marks IV, XII and XXII
 

 

Naval guns of the United Kingdom
100 mm artillery
Coastal artillery
World War I naval weapons of the United Kingdom
World War II naval weapons of the United Kingdom